Firuzbahram (also Romanized as Fīrūzbahrām and Fīrūz Bahrām) is a village in Firuzbahram Rural District, Chahardangeh District, Eslamshahr County, Tehran Province, Iran. At the 2006 census, its population was 1,841, in 487 families.

References 

Populated places in Eslamshahr County